The 8th Nuestra Belleza México pageant, was held at the Aeropuerto Internacional "Lic. Adolfo López Mateos" of Toluca, Estado de México, Mexico on September 28, 2001. Forty-seven contestants of the Mexican Republic competed for the national title, which was won by Ericka Cruz from Yucatán, who later competed in Miss Universe 2002 in Puerto Rico. Cruz was crowned by outgoing Nuestra Belleza México titleholder Jacqueline Bracamontes. She is the first and only Yucateca and the third winner of foreign descent (she is Afro-Mexican) to win this Title.

The Nuestra Belleza Mundo México title was won by Tatiana Rodríguez from Campeche, who later competed in Miss World 2001 in South Africa. Rodríguez was crowned by outgoing Nuestra Belleza Mundo México titleholder Paulina Flores. She is the first and only Campechana to win this Title.

For the second consecutive time and for the four time in the history of the pageant, two events were held separately to select the two winners for the titles Nuestra Belleza México and Nuestra Belleza Mundo México.

Results

PlaceMents Nuestra Belleza México

Order of announcements

Top 10
Sinaloa
Yucatán
Jalisco
Chihuahua
Sonora
Sonora
Tamaulipas
Coahuila
Nuevo León
Sinaloa

Top five
Sonora
Nuevo León
Yucatán
Chihuahua
Coahuila

Nuestra Belleza Mundo México
One week before the final competition was held the semi-final competition with a live show entitled "Nuestra Belleza Mundo Mexico" in which was announced the winner of the Nuestra Belleza Mundo México title Tatiana Rodríguez from Campeche who represented the country in Miss World 2001. All contestants competed in swimsuit and evening gown during the contest.

The Nuestra Belleza Mundo México pageant was held at the Aeropuerto Internacional "Lic. Adolfo López Mateos" of Toluca, Estado de México and was hosted by Mónica Noguera and Julio Bracho. It was the 4th edition of the "Nuestra Belleza Mundo México" contest and as an official separate pageant to choose Mexico's representative to Miss World. From this year he Winner of this event does not compete in the final night competition.

The musical part was enlivened by: Dinastía, Gustavo Lara and Cristian Castro.

Order of announcements

Top 21
Distrito Federal
Coahuila
Guanajuato
Sonora
Veracruz
Sonora
Sinaloa
Jalisco
Campeche
Veracruz
Jalisco

Guanajuato
Jalisco
Tamaulipas
Sinaloa
Chihuahua
Sinaloa
Nuevo León
Nuevo León
Yucatán
Sonora

Special awards

Judges

Preliminary competition
Guido Quiles – El Modelo México 2000
Mariana Tazbek – Photographer
Leonardo Leos – Makeup Artist
Diana Torrescano – Medical Beauty Director
Alan Loranka – Astrologer
Sara Bustani – Fashion Designer
Jorge Salinas – Actor
Yessica Salazar – Nuestra Belleza Mundo México 1996 and Actress
Otto Sirgo – Actor

Final competition
Carlos Latapi – Photographer
Rebeca Tamez – Nuestra Belleza México 1996 & Señorita Continente Americano 1997
Sabú – Artistic Promoter
Gabriel Soto – El Modelo México 1996, Singer & Actor
Raquel Bessudo – Writer
Valentino Lanús – Actor
Leonardo Leos – Makeup Artist
Laura Flores – Actress, Singer & TV Hostess
Saul Lisazo – Actor

Background Music
Opening Number: "Nuestra Belleza México" (Official Theme)
Intermediate: "Call my Bluff" by Wendy Fitzwilliam
Intermediate: "Si no te Hubieras Ido" and "O me Voy o te Vas" by Marco Antonio Solis
Crowning Moment: "Nuestra Belleza México" (Official Theme)

Contestants

Designates

 – Paulina García
 – Rosario Meza
 – Ericka Castro
 – Ofelia Chávez
 – Claudia Albo
 – Karín Huerta
 – Letícia Jiménez
 – Sarahí Álvarez
 – Ana Inés Santoyo
 – Elsa Burgos

 – Claudia Collado
 – Mónica Psihas
 – Carmén Valera
 – Lizeth Pérez
 – Alicia Rojas
 – Adriana Loya
 – Arumi Vargas
 – Andrea Macías
 – Valeria Loya

Returning states
Last competed in 1999:

Withdrawals

Historical significance
Yucatán won the Nuestra Belleza México title for the first time.
This was the third time a Winner of Nuestra Belleza México pageant is of foreign descent (Ericka Cruz is Afro-Mexican).
Camepeche won the Nuestra Belleza Mundo México title for the first time.
Coahuila was the Suplente/1st Runner-up for the first time.
For the second time an Afro-Mexican compete in the Nuestra Belleza México pageant (Ericka Cruz from Yucatán, before 1999).
For the second consecutive year held two competitions, one semi-final (Nuestra Belleza Mundo México) and the final competition (Nuestra Belleza México).
Like last year, 21 delegates were chosen to participate in the final competition, but the winner of the semi-final competition wasn't involved in the final night because she started her preparation to compete in Miss World 2001.
That was the year with more candidates in the contest (47 Contestants).
For the first time Quintana Roo retires from competition.
Aguascalientes, Baja California, Campeche, Durango and Nayarit return to competition after two years (1999).
Distrito Federal and Nuevo León placed for eighth consecutive year.
Chihuahua placed for fourth consecutive year.
Sinaloa, Sonora and Tamaulipas placed for third consecutive year.
Coahuila, Jalisco, Veracruz and Yucatán placed for second consecutive year.
Guanajuato returned to making calls to the semi-finals after two years (1999), while Campeche after four years (1997).
States that were called to the semi-finals last year and this year failed to qualify were Baja California Sur, Colima, Querétaro, San Luis Potosí and Zacatecas.
For the first time Alexis Ayala hosted the pageant with Lupita Jones.
Distrito Federal won Miss Photogenic and Fuller Beauty Queen for the first time.
Tamaulipas won the Best Hair Award for second time (before 1999) and Miss Internet for the first time.
Coahuila won the Lala Light Figure Award for the first time.
Yucatán won the Best National Costume for the first time.
The host delegate, Eva Geynes from the Estado de México, failed to place in the semi-finals.
Sonora (Lizeth Pérez) is the higher delegate in this edition (1.80 m).
Baja California (Bibian López and Paulina García), Colima (Laura Mancilla), Estado de México (Eva Geynes), Nayarit (Claudia Fernández), Puebla (Karla Gómez), Sinaloa (Mónica Psihas), Tabasco (Alejandra Priego) and Tamaulipas (Mónica Aragón) are the lower delegates in this edition (1.68 m).

Contestant notes
 – Berenice Cosio Nuestra Belleza Baja California Sur 2001 is cousin of Daniela Cosio Nuestra Belleza Baja California Sur 2005.
 – Tatiana Rodríguez competed in Miss World 2001, held on November 16, 2001, at the Super Bowl, in Sun City Entertainment Centre, Sun City, South Africa but she didn't place. Also she participated in the famous reality show Big Brother México, and today is a television hostess and actress.
 – Greta Galindo competed in Reina Internacional de las Flores 2002 but she didn't place.
 – Ofelia Chávez competed in Miss Atlántico Internacional 2003.
 – Diana García is dedicated to the cinema where she participated in productions such as: "Casi Divas" and "Amar", among others. She has participated in soap operas like "Top Models" and special events such as "Adelantadas al Mundial" to Foxlife chain in 2006. She has made music videosr with Reik, Sin Bandera, Moenia, Eduardo Cruz, among others. It has also led film festivals: International Film Festival Guanajuato 2007 and 2008 and International Film Festival Monterrey 2008. She has made numerous television commercials.
 – Elsa Burgos was selected by the Organization to represent Mexico in the international contest Miss Costa Maya International 2002 in Belize where she won the 1st Place. She was hostess of the program shows Ellas con las Estrellas (Them with the stars). She is a TV Hostess in Monterrey, Nuevo León.
 – Claudia Collado competed in Miss Atlántico Internacional 2002.
 – Erika Peña represented Mexico in Queen Mayan World 2001 where she won 1st Place.
 – Mónica Aragón represented Mexico in the Reinado Internacional del Café 2002 in Medellín, Colombia. Also she is sister of Rosa María Aragón, Nuestra Belleza Tamaulipas 1999.
 – Ericka Cruz represented her country in Miss Universe 2002 held in Coliseo Roberto Clemente in San Juan, Puerto Rico on May 29, 2002, but she didn't place. She was the first Afro-Mexican that represented Mexico in the Miss Universe history and the second Afro-Mexican to compete in the Nuestra Belleza México pageant. In 2010 she was crowned Reina del Carnaval 2010 in Mérida, Yucatán.

Crossovers

Contestants who previously competed or will compete at other beauty pageants:

Miss Universe
 2002: : Ericka Cruz

Miss World
 2001: : Tatiana Rodríguez

Miss Atlántico Internacional 
 2002: : Claudia Collado
 2003: : Ofelia Chávez

Reinado Internacional de las Flores
 2002: : Greta Galindo

Reinado Internacional del Café
 2002: : Mónica Aragón

Miss Costa Maya International
 2002: : Elsa Burgos (Winner)

Queen Mayan World
 2001: : Erika Peña (Winner)

Reina del Carnaval Mérida
 2010: : Ericka Cruz (Winner)

References

External links
Official Website

.México
2001 in Mexico
2001 beauty pageants